The Kelly M. West Award for Outstanding Achievement in Epidemiology is an honor bestowed by the American Diabetes Association. It has been awarded annually to an individual since 1986. The award is named in honor of Kelly M. West.

Winners 

Source:

See also

 List of medicine awards

References 

Medicine awards
American science and technology awards
Epidemiology